Patrick Hagan (October 1879 – 14 July 1916) was a Scottish professional footballer who played as a forward in the Scottish League for Hibernian and Port Glasgow Athletic. He won five pieces of silverware with Irish League club Linfield between 1903 and 1904.

Personal life 
Hagan served in the Boer War with the Royal Scots and later served in the 11th Battalion during the First World War. On 14 July 1916, at age 36, he was killed in the vicinity of Beaumont-Hamel, during the Battle of the Somme. Hagan was commemorated on the Thiepval Memorial, Pier and Face 6D and 7D.

Honours 
Linfield
 Irish League: 1903–04
 Irish Cup: 1903–04
 County Antrim Shield: 1903–04
 Belfast Charity Cup: 1902–03
 City Cup: 1902–03

Career statistics

References

Scottish footballers
Port Glasgow Athletic F.C. players
Brentford F.C. players
1916 deaths
Scottish Football League players
Hibernian F.C. players
British Army personnel of World War I
British Army personnel of the Second Boer War
Royal Scots soldiers
British military personnel killed in the Battle of the Somme
NIFL Premiership players
Military personnel from Edinburgh
Linfield F.C. players
Irish League representative players
Footballers from Edinburgh
Association football forwards
1879 births